The XII (Royal Saxon) Reserve Corps was a corps level command of the German Army in World War I.

Formation 
XII Reserve Corps was formed on the outbreak of the war in August 1914 as part of the mobilisation of the Army.  It was initially commanded by General der Artillerie Hans von Kirchbach, recalled from retirement.  It was still in existence at the end of the war in Armee-Abteilung C, Heeresgruppe Gallwitz on the Western Front.

Structure on formation 
On formation in August 1914, XII Reserve Corps consisted of two divisions, made up of reserve units.  In general, Reserve Corps and Reserve Divisions were weaker than their active counterparts
Reserve Infantry Regiments did not always have three battalions nor necessarily contain a machine gun company
Reserve Jäger Battalions did not have a machine gun company on formation 
Reserve Cavalry Regiments consisted of just three squadrons 
Reserve Field Artillery Regiments usually consisted of two abteilungen of three batteries each, though the Reserve Field Artillery Regiments of XII Corps had three abteilungen 
Corps Troops generally consisted of a Telephone Detachment and four sections of munition columns and trains 

In summary, XII Reserve Corps mobilised with 26 infantry battalions, 6 machine gun companies (36 machine guns), 6 cavalry squadrons, 18 field artillery batteries (108 guns) and 3 pioneer companies.

24th Reserve Division was formed by units drawn from the XIX Corps District.

Combat chronicle 
On mobilisation, XII Reserve Corps was assigned to the predominantly Saxon 3rd Army on the right wing of the forces that invaded France as part of the Schlieffen Plan offensive in August 1914.

Commanders 
XII Reserve Corps had the following commanders during its existence:

See also 

German Army order of battle (1914)
German Army order of battle, Western Front (1918)

References

Bibliography 
 
 
 
 

Corps of Germany in World War I
Military units and formations established in 1914
Military units and formations disestablished in 1919